Alfentanil (R-39209, trade name Alfenta, Rapifen in Australia) is a potent but short-acting synthetic opioid analgesic drug, used for anaesthesia in surgery. It is an analogue of fentanyl with around one-fourth to one-tenth the potency, one-third the duration of action, and an onset of action four times faster than that of fentanyl. Alfentanil has a pKa of approximately 6.5, which leads to a very high proportion of the drug being uncharged at physiologic pH, a characteristic responsible for its rapid onset. It is an agonist at mu opioid receptors.

While alfentanil tends to cause fewer cardiovascular complications than other similar drugs such as fentanyl and remifentanil, it tends to give stronger respiratory depression and so requires careful monitoring of breathing and vital signs. Almost exclusively used by anesthesia providers during portions of a case where quick, fast-acting (though not long-lasting) pain control is needed (as, for example, during nerve blocks), alfentanil is administered by the parenteral (injected) route for fast onset and precise control of dosage.

Discovered at Janssen Pharmaceutica in 1976, alfentanil is classified as a Schedule II drug in the United States.

Side effects of fentanyl analogs are similar to those of fentanyl itself and include itching, nausea and potentially life-threatening respiratory depression. Fentanyl analogs have killed hundreds of people throughout Europe and the former Soviet republics since the most recent resurgence in use began in Estonia in the early 2000s, and novel derivatives continue to appear.

References

External links
 Medline Plus Patient Information - 09/01/2010
 https://www.fda.gov/Drugs/DevelopmentApprovalProcess/DevelopmentResources/DrugInteractionsLabeling/ucm093664.htm February 2017
 Genf interaction table- https://www.hug.ch/sites/interhug/files/structures/pharmacologie_et_toxicologie_cliniques/carte_cytochromes_2016_final.pdf February 2017

General anesthetics
Synthetic opioids
Piperidines
Tetrazoles
Ureas
Ethers
Lactams
Anilides
Mu-opioid receptor agonists
Janssen Pharmaceutica
Belgian inventions
Fentanyl